The 2013 BWF Season was the overall badminton circuit organized by the Badminton World Federation (BWF) for the 2013 badminton season to publish and promote the sport. Besides the BWF World Championships, BWF promotes the sport of badminton through an extensive worldwide programme of events in four structure levels.  They were the individual tournaments called Super Series, Grand Prix Events, International Challenge and International Series.  Besides the individual tournaments, team events such as Thomas Cup & Uber Cup and Sudirman Cup are held every other year.

The 2013 BWF season calendar comprised the World Championships tournaments, the Sudirman Cup, the BWF Super Series (Super Series, Super Series Premier, Super Series Finals), the Grand Prix (Grand Prix Gold and Grand Prix), the International Series (International Series and International Challenge), and Future Series.

Schedule
This is the complete schedule of events on the 2013 calendar, with the Champions and Runners-up documented.
Key

January

February

March

April

May

June

July

August

September

October

November

December

References

External links
Badminton World Federation (BWF)

2013 in badminton
Badminton World Federation seasons